Scantraxx Reloaded was a Dutch record label and sub label of Scantraxx Records. Scantraxx Reloaded was owned by Willem Rebergen (who released music through the label under the name Headhunterz), and specialized in releases by Headhunterz, Gostosa, Wildstylez and Project One.

Releases

References

Dutch record labels